Mount Mikeno is an extinct volcanic mountain located in the Democratic Republic of the Congo section of the Virunga Mountains along with Mount Nyiragongo, Mount Nyamuragira, Mount Karisimbi, Mount Bisoke and Mount Sabyinyo. At  Mount Mikeno is the second highest peak in the Virunga Mountains after Karisimbi, and the 13th highest mountain of Africa.  Mikeno means "poor" and is so named for its harsh slopes which preclude human habitation. 

Mount Mikeno lies completely within Virunga National Park and is known for the critically endangered mountain gorillas that live on its slopes.   Expeditions to observe Mikeno's gorillas typically leave from the nearby Bukima Patrol Post. 

Mount Mikeno is the type locality of the yellow-crested helmetshrike Prionops alberti.

Notes

References

External links

Virunga Mountains
Mountains of the Democratic Republic of the Congo
Stratovolcanoes of the Democratic Republic of the Congo
Pleistocene stratovolcanoes
Four-thousanders of Africa
Volcanoes of the Great Rift Valley
Democratic Republic of the Congo–Rwanda border
Volcanoes of the Democratic Republic of the Congo